The Morton Matthew McCarver House, also known as Locust Farm, was built in 1850 in Oregon City, Oregon, United States, for Morton M. McCarver.

History
The house was prefabricated in Boston with Maine lumber and shipped to Oregon via Cape Horn. At the time of its erection in the 1850s it was therefore an unusually refined residence for frontier-era Oregon. Subsequent additions have more than doubled its size.

McCarver arrived in Oregon in 1843, but moved to California, profiting from the California gold rush. He returned to Oregon in 1850 on his packet Ocean Bird with the building materials. In 1859 McCarver moved to Portland, selling to the Warner family, who renamed the property "Locust Farm" and lived at the place until 1947.

The McCarver House was listed on the National Register of Historic Places on January 21, 1974.

See also
National Register of Historic Places listings in Clackamas County, Oregon

References

External links
Morton Matthew McCarver House at Oregon City website
 

National Register of Historic Places in Clackamas County, Oregon
Houses completed in 1850
Historic American Buildings Survey in Oregon
1850 establishments in Oregon Territory
Houses on the National Register of Historic Places in Oregon
Buildings and structures in Oregon City, Oregon
Prefabricated houses
Houses in Clackamas County, Oregon